The Six Days of Nouméa was a six-day track cycling race held annually in Nouméa, capital of the French overseas territory of New Caledonia, from 1977 until 2003.

Winners

References

Cycle races in France
Sports competitions in Nouméa
Six-day races
Defunct cycling races in France
Recurring sporting events established in 1977
1977 establishments in France